Mizpah church is one of the oldest churches in Perambure, Kannigapuram area of Chennai, the capital of the South Indian state of Tamil Nadu. The original structure was built in 1995. The church is named after Mizpah Prayer Tabernacle who founded the mission of the Free Church.

Mizpah Prayer Tabernacle is a working church with hourly prayer and Sunday services and it follows Protestant sect of Christianity. The church also celebrates Anniversary festival every year during the month of May. In modern times, it is under the dominion of the Diocese of Madras of the Church of South India. It is one of the most prominent landmarks of Perambur, Kannigapuram.

Churches in Chennai